Hamilton Township is the name of some places in the U.S. state of Pennsylvania:

Hamilton Township, Adams County, Pennsylvania
Hamilton Township, Franklin County, Pennsylvania
Hamilton Township, McKean County, Pennsylvania
Hamilton Township, Monroe County, Pennsylvania
Hamilton Township, Tioga County, Pennsylvania

Pennsylvania township disambiguation pages